The Resilient Floor Covering Institute (RFCI) is a U.S. industry trade group representing manufacturers of resilient flooring, primarily made of vinyl. It is headquartered in Rockville, Maryland.

It is notable for suing the state of New York in 2003, claiming that its vinyl flooring should be recognized as a "green" building material.

See also
Vinyl composition tiles

References

External links
Resilient Floor Covering Institute
Ceramic tiles click vinyl flooring

Rockville, Maryland
Floors
Vinyl polymers
Trade associations based in the United States